Amsterdam Concert is a rare live Miles Davis recording from 1957. This album was recorded at the Concertgebouw in Amsterdam on December 8, 1957, a couple of days after the recording of the movie soundtrack Ascenseur pour l'échafaud. Davis recorded the album with drummer Kenny Clarke and three French musicians: Pierre Michelot on bass, Rene Urtreger on piano, and Barney Wilen on tenor saxophone.

Reception

In a review for AllMusic, Scott Yanow wrote: "this hard-to-find set is recommended for the rare opportunity to hear Miles Davis stretching out with these musicians."

Writing for The Guardian, John Fordham called the album "a real rarity," and commented: "The upshot is that Davis's one-off relationship with the Club St Germain's house rhythm section for the Malle project... doesn't sound quite as compatible as it did for the soundtrack, where the need to swing was reduced - but it's still a fascinating document."

Track listing
"Woody 'n' You" (Dizzy Gillespie) - 5:07
"Bags' Groove" (Milt Jackson) - 7:17
"What's New" (Bob Haggart) - 3:41
"But Not for Me" (George Gershwin) - 6:52
"A Night in Tunisia" (Gillespie) - 7:30
"Four" (Miles Davis) - 4:33
"Walkin'" (Richard Carpenter) - 6:48
"Well You Needn't" (Thelonious Monk) - 5:36
"'Round About Midnight" (Monk) - 5:37
"Lady Bird" (Tadd Dameron) - 5:50

Personnel
 Miles Davis – trumpet
 Barney Wilen – tenor saxophone
 René Urtreger – piano
 Pierre Michelot – bass
 Kenny Clarke – drums

References

Miles Davis live albums
2005 live albums